Walker Calhoun (May 13, 1918 – March 28, 2012) was an Eastern Band Cherokee musician, dancer, and teacher. He was a medicine man and spiritual leader who worked to preserve the history, religion, and herbal healing methods of his people. With these many talents Walker proved himself instrumental in the preservation of Cherokee tradition’s.

Early life and education 
Walker Calhoun was born on May 13, 1918, in Big Cove, North Carolina. Calhoun Was the youngest of 12 children born to Sally Ann Calhoun and Morgan Calhoun.

When Walker was nine, his father died; around the same time, he stopped going to school to work on the family farm. At the age of 12, Calhoun attended a boarding school in Cherokee, North Carolina, where he learned a little English. Before that time, he had rarely heard English because his mother did not speak it (this was customary in the Eastern Cherokee tribe).

Throughout his childhood, Walker learned Cherokee songs and dances from his Uncle Will West Long. He learned traditional medicine from his mother. Walker also taught himself how to play the banjo during these formative years.

Career 
During WW2, Walker was drafted into the U.S. army. During the war, he served as a Combat Engineer in Germany. After the war, the army sent him to California. Walker married Evelyn Calhoun, and together they fed the mouths of 10 hungry children. Walker worked for the North Carolina Department of Highways. After which, “for about 20 years, I worked for a plant in Cherokee.” At age 62, Walker retired.

In the 1980’s Walker founded the Raven Rock Dancers. Through this group, he began teaching the Cherokee youth the songs of his uncle Long. Some of these songs are listed below.

In the late 1980’s Calhoun recorded some of these songs at the “Cherokee museum.” For this, he won several awards. The “Best folk recordings list” and the “National heritage Fellows award.”

Walker Calhoun was an active member of the eastern Cherokee community. Throughout his lifetime, he opposed the creation of casinos within the reservation, saying, “the young people think it will be our salvation. I think it will be our damnation”. He also took part in some land reclamation involved with the Cowee mound.

Death and legacy 
Much of the Cherokee’s songs and dances were lost, after years of The U.S. Government's, Missionary's and Educator's attempt to suppress native tradition. Walker’s knowledge of some of these practices has proven instrumental in retaining and reintroducing Cherokee traditions back into the Cherokee community. Walker makes his view of these traditions clear saying, "It was on the verge of going out of existence... Ima try and bring it back if I can."  Walker was pivotal in reestablishing Cherokee identity through his Raven Rock years. He also made several records; hence some of his knowledge can be accessed even after his death. Walker died on march 28, 2012, at the age of 94. Some of Walker’s recordings can be found at Berea Colleges Hutchins library. He also made two albums of his songs called Where Ravens Roost and Sacred Songs from Medicine Lake.

Awards and honors
1988 - Sequoyah Award, awarded to the person who has done the most to preserve and teach Cherokee culture; Calhoun was the first recipient of this award

1990 - North Carolina Folk Heritage Award

1992 - National Heritage Fellowship from the National Endowment for the Arts

References

External links
 
 

1918 births
2012 deaths
Eastern Band Cherokee people
National Heritage Fellowship winners
Native American musicians
Native American dancers
People from Cherokee, North Carolina
20th-century Native Americans
21st-century Native Americans